The AACTA International Award for Best Direction is an award that is presented by the Australian Academy of Cinema and Television Arts (AACTA), to a director of a film made outside Australia. It was first handed out by the Academy after its establishment in 2011 by the Australian Film Institute (AFI). The winners and nominees for 2011 were determined by a jury.

Winners and nominees
In the following table, the winner is marked in a separate colour, and highlighted in boldface; the nominees are those that are not highlighted or in boldface.

2010s

2020s

See also
 AACTA Awards
 AACTA Award for Best Direction

References

External links
 The Australian Academy of Cinema and Television Arts Official website

D
Awards for best director